The floral wrasse (Cheilinus chlorourus) is a species of wrasse native to the Indian Ocean and the western Pacific Ocean from the coast of Africa to the Tuamotus and Marquesas. Its range extends as far north as the Ryukyus and south to New Caledonia. This species can reach  in total length. It is of minor importance to local commercial fisheries and can also be found in the aquarium trade.

Description 
It has a mottled body with sand colored spots. It is about 13in.

Habitat 
The Floral wrasse lives in reefs in lagoon and coastal water at depth of 1–30 meters.

Distribution
The Floral wrasse lives from the West Indian Ocean to the central/west Pacific Ocean.

Diet
It mostly eats crustaceans, other invertebrates, and fish.

References

External links
 

Fish of Thailand
Floral wrasse
Fish described in 1791
Taxa named by Marcus Elieser Bloch